Carlisle Historic District may refer to:

Carlisle Historic District (Carlisle, Kentucky), listed on the National Register of Historic Places in Nicholas County, Kentucky
Carlisle Historic District (Carlisle, Pennsylvania), listed on the National Register of Historic Places in Cumberland County, Pennsylvania